Freddie Stevenson (born April 4, 1995) is a former American football fullback. He played college football at Florida State, and signed with the Chicago Bears as an undrafted free agent in 2017, and also played for the Orlando Apollos.

High school and college career
Stevenson played high school football at Bartow High School in Bartow, Florida where he played linebacker.

In 2013 Stevenson appeared in games as a backup Fullback.

By 2014, Stevenson would appear in all 14 games as a fullback starting in 7 of those games.

In 2015, Stevenson would start in 10 games and blocked for Dalvin Cook who had a record setting single-season performance for rushing yards (1,691) and all-purpose yards (1,935).

In his final season with the Seminoles he would rush for 95 yards on 13 carries for 4 touchdowns.

Professional career

Chicago Bears
Stevenson signed with the Chicago Bears as an undrafted free agent, following the 2017 NFL Draft. On September 2, 2017, Stevenson was waived by the Bears.

Orlando Apollos
Stevenson signed with the Orlando Apollos in 2018 for the 2019 season.

Post-playing career
In June 2019, Stevenson announced he had ended his football career, citing the NFL's decrease in using fullbacks, and created the Triumph 105 clothing line.

References

External links
 Triumph 105 website

1995 births
Living people
Chicago Bears players
Florida State Seminoles football players
Orlando Apollos players
Sportspeople from Bartow, Florida